{{Infobox government agency
| name                 = Bureau of Audiovisual and Music Industry Development
| native_name          = 
| native_name_a        = 文化部影視及流行音樂產業局
| native_name_r        = Wénhuàbù Yǐngshìjí Liú[[']]xíng Yīnyuè Chǎnyèjú
| type                 = 
| seal                 = 
| seal_size            = 
| seal_caption         = 
| seal_alt             = 
| logo                 = 
| logo_size            = 
| logo_caption         = 
| logo_alt             = 
| image                = ROC-MOC Bureau of Audiovisual and Music Industry Development 20130910.jpg
| image_size           = 225px
| image_caption        = 
| image_alt            = 
| formed               = 22 May 2012
| preceding1           = 
| dissolved            = 
| superseding1         = 
| agency_type          = 
| jurisdiction         = Taiwan
| status               = 
| headquarters         = Zhongzheng, Taipei, Taiwan
| coordinates          = 
| motto                = 
| employees            = 
| budget               = 
| chief1_name          = Chu Wen-ching
| chief1_position      = Director
| parent_department    = 
| parent_agency        = Ministry of Culture
| parent_agency_type   = 
| child1_agency        = 
| keydocument1         = 
| website              =  
| agency_id            = 
| map                  = 
| map_size             = 
| map_caption          = 
| map_alt              = 
| footnotes            = 
| embed                = 
}}

The Bureau of Audiovisual and Music Industry Development (BAMID''') is the bureau of the Ministry of Culture of the Republic of China responsible for supervising and promoting film, broadcasting, television and popular music sectors of Taiwan.

History
The BAMID was inaugurated on 22 May 2012 by Minister of Culture Lung Ying-tai.

Transportation
The bureau is accessible within walking distance west from Taipei Main Station.

See also
 Ministry of Culture (Taiwan)
 Music of Taiwan

References

External links
  

2012 establishments in Taiwan
Executive Yuan
Government agencies established in 2012
Government of Taiwan